Ziçisht is a settlement in the Korçë County, southeastern Albania. It is part of the former municipality Miras. At the 2015 local government reform it became part of the municipality Devoll.

It has a population of about 300. Many of its people emigrated to Greece or the United States because of the harsh living conditions.

Notable people
Bishop Eulogios (Kourilas) of Korçë (1880–1961) Orthodox bishop.
 Constantin Anastas Chekrezi, nationalist figure, historian, and publisher
 Petraq Zoto, writer
Mihallaq Ziçishti Former Vice Minister of the Interior until 1982, known for the grotesque defense of himself in the Communist trial, that saved him the life.

References

Populated places in Devoll (municipality)
Villages in Korçë County